The Georgia College Bobcats are the athletic teams that represent Georgia College & State University, located in Milledgeville, Georgia, in intercollegiate sports at the Division II level of the National Collegiate Athletic Association (NCAA), primarily competing in the Peach Belt Conference since the 1990–91 academic year.

Georgia College competes in eleven intercollegiate varsity sports. Men's sports include baseball, basketball, cross country, golf, and tennis; while women's sports include basketball, cross country, soccer, softball, tennis, and volleyball.

Conference affiliations 
NCAA
 Peach Belt Conference (1990–present)

Varsity teams

Notable alumni

Men's basketball 
 Earl Grant

Women's soccer 
 Daria Owen

References

External links